The Milano Monza Open-Air Motor Show (MIMO) is an annual auto show held in June 2021 in Milan and Monza, Italy.

Initially scheduled for June 2020 and then postponed to October 2020 and finally postponed again to June 2021 due to the COVID-19 pandemic.

The installations of 63 brands participating in the Milano Monza Open-Air Motor Show 2021 have been placed in an ideal walk that starts from piazza della Scala, crosses corso Vittorio Emanuele II, piazza Duomo, piazza della Scala, to move to via Mercanti, via Dante and then at the Castello Sforzesco and in the Foro Buonaparte. 

The event focused on the mobility of the future and on the evolution of the car, and alongside 100% electric (the focus on EVs was present in Piazza Castello), hybrids, city cars and SUVs, visitors also discovered the prototypes of coachbuilders and racing cars. With the help of the QR codes placed on each platform, the public viewed the webpage reserved for each model, with technical data sheets, images, videos and links to contact the manufacturers.

The installations of over 63 brands were present at inaugural edition, including: Alfa Romeo, Aprilia, Aston Martin, Audi, Lamborghini, Bentley, BMW, BMW Motorrad, Bugatti, Cadillac, Citroën, Corvette, Cupra, Dallara, DR, DS, Ducati, Enel X, EVO, Ferrari, Fiat, Ford, Garage Italia, Harley Davidson, Helbiz, Hyundai, Honda, Jaguar, Jeep, Kawasaki, KIA, Lancia, Land Rover, Lexus, MAK Wheels, Maserati, Mazda, McLaren, MG, Militem, MINI, Mitsubishi, Mole Automobiles, Moto Guzzi, MV Agusta, Opel, Pagani, Pambuffetti, Peugeot, Pirelli, Porsche, Renault, SEAT, SEAT MÓ, Škoda, Suzuki, Tazzari EV, Toyota, Volkswagen, and Zero Motorcycles.

2022 
In the 2022 edition, the brands were present: Aiways, Alfa Romeo, Alpine, Aston Martin, Automobili Amos, Lamborghini, Bentley, Chevrolet, Citroën, Dallara, Dodge, DR, DS Automobiles, Energica, EVO, Ferrari, Fiat, Harley-Davidson, Honda, Hyundai, ICKX, Jannarelly, Jeep, Kawasaki, KIA, Lancia, Leasys Rent, Lexus, Mazda, McLaren, Mercedes-Benz, Mitsubishi, Mole Urbana, MV Agusta, Nissan, Opel, Pagani, Peugeot, Pirelli, Ram, Seres, Soriano Motors, Sportequipe, Suzuki, Touring Superleggera, Toyota, XEV, Zagato, Zero Motorcycles.

The following vehicles were showcased at the show in 2022: 

 Alfa Romeo Tonale
 Aston Martin DBS
 Aston Martin DBX 707
 Bentley Continental GT V8 Convertible
 Bentley Bentayga S
 Chevrolet Corvette Stingray
 Ferrari 296 GTB
 Lamborghini Huracàn Tecnica
 Lancia Y Ferretti

2021 

The following vehicles were showcased at the show in 2021: 

 Bugatti Chiron Super Sport 
 Bugatti Bolide
 Bugatti Chiron Pur Sport
 Bugatti Chiron Sport
 Lamborghini Sián
 Lamborghini Huracán STO
 Audi RS e-tron GT
 Ducati Diavel 1260 S "Black and Steel"
 Cupra Formentor VZ e-HYBRID
 Porsche Taycan 4S Cross Turismo
 Bentley Bentayga V8 First Edition
 McLaren Artura
 SEAT Nuova Leon e-HYBRID
 Suzuki Across Plugin 2.5 Yoru 4WD
 New DR 5.0
 DR 6.0
 EVO 3
 Pambuffetti PJ-01
 Renault Arkana e-Tech Hybrid
 Hyundai Bayon Hybrid 48V
 Toyota Yaris Cross Premiere
 Peugeot 308 Plug-In Hybrid
 Opel Mokka-e 
 Jeep Wrangler 4xe Plug-In Hybrid
 Fiat 500 Cabrio BEV ICON 
 DS Automobiles DS9 E-TENSE Ibrido Plug-In

References

Auto shows in Italy
2021 establishments in Italy
Milan
Monza